Monthika Anuchan (born 16 January 1980) is a Thai former professional tennis player.

Anuchan, a three-time Southeast Asian Games medalist, competed for the Thailand Fed Cup team between 1999 and 2001. She made all of her Fed Cup singles appearances in 1999, with wins over Lilia Biktyakova (Uzbekistan) and Liza Andriyani (Indonesia), then in the next two campaigns featured solely as a doubles player.

ITF finals

Doubles: 2 (0–2)

References

External links
 
 
 

1980 births
Living people
Monthika Anuchan
Competitors at the 1999 Southeast Asian Games
Southeast Asian Games medalists in tennis
Monthika Anuchan
Monthika Anuchan
Monthika Anuchan